Henry Hoare was an English banker and garden owner-designer.

Henry Hoare may also refer to:

Henry Hoare (banker) (1677–1725), his father
Henry Hoare of Mitcham Grove (1750–1828), English banker
Henry Hoare (MCC cricketer, 1823) (1784–1836), English cricketer
Henry Hoare (cricketer, born 1844) (1844–1931), cricketer for Oxford University
Henry Hoare (1807–1866), English banker, and lay activist for the Church of England, grandson of Henry Hoare of Mitcham Grove
Sir Henry Hugh Hoare, 3rd Baronet (1762–1841), banker
Sir Henry Hoare, 5th Baronet (1824–1894), banker and politician
Sir Henry Hugh Arthur Hoare, 6th Baronet (1865–1947), English landowner